Wally Voss was a North-American bass player born on July 25, 1958. He was the bass player of Ft. Lauderdale local bands Pearl and later Front Runner, then played live with Yngwie Malmsteen on the Trilogy tour. Later in 1987, he played the bass parts on the Out of the Sun album from Joey Tafolla. Wally Voss died from Hodgkin's lymphoma in November 29, 1992 at the age of 34.

Discography

 1987: Out of the Sun by Joey Tafolla
 1992: Basses Loaded by Wally Voss, ASIN # B000I3YIGG

Videography
 Roy Vogt Superchops 4 bass: Getting the most out of the 5 string bass, VHS and DVD, guest appearance from Wally Voss
 Beaver Felton Superchops 4 bass: Workout!, VHS and DVD, guest appearance from Wally Voss, This video was on the Do Not Watch List on Late Night with Jimmy Fallon
 Yngwie Malmsteen: Raw Live, DVD, 1981–1999 authorized bootleg footage, several appearances from Wally Voss

External links 
 Wally Voss' MySpace Page

1958 births
1992 deaths
American rock bass guitarists
American male bass guitarists
Deaths from Hodgkin lymphoma
20th-century American bass guitarists
20th-century American male musicians
Yngwie J. Malmsteen's Rising Force members